i-News is the flagship late night news program of the Philippine television network Net 25, anchored by Alma Angeles. It is an English version and a spin-off of i-Balita, The show aired from August 11, 2008 to October 24, 2011, replacing Net 25 Report and was replaced by Eagle News Evening Edition.

History
I-Balita and I-News are the same in format, but different in emphasis. I-Balita features local, business, weather and international news, while I-News features a daily round-up of the latest international, business, technology, sports, entertainment, environment, science, health and feature stories.

Programme anchors Ivy Canlas and Karen Santos were replaced by Alma Angeles on January 17, 2011.

Trivia
 Alma Angeles is the pioneer anchor of Net 25, which started her career on July 27, 1999 and on May 4, 2000.  She started the UltraVision 25 Report & Planet 25 Report then went on to anchoring Net 25 Report.  She left the news reformat on April 30, 2001. World Report Early Edition to head Net 25's International Programming/Broadcast and its Operations. Aside from managing Net 25's International Operations, she also anchors and produces Eagle News International and ASEAN in Focus at the same time.

See also
List of programs previously broadcast by Net 25
I-Balita

Philippine television news shows
2008 Philippine television series debuts
2011 Philippine television series endings
English-language television shows
Flagship evening news shows
Net 25 original programming